The 1909 West Clare by-election was held on 3 September 1909.  The by-election was held due to the death of the incumbent Irish Parliamentary MP, James Halpin.  It was won by the Irish Parliamentary candidate Arthur Lynch, who was unopposed.

References

By-elections to the Parliament of the United Kingdom in County Clare constituencies
1909 elections in the United Kingdom
Unopposed by-elections to the Parliament of the United Kingdom (need citation)
1909 elections in Ireland